Prince Adolf Wilhelm Carl Daniel von Auersperg (21 July 1821 in Vlašim, Bohemia – 5 January 1885 in Schloss Goldegg, Neidling) was an Austro-Bohemian statesman. He served as 8th Minister-President of Cisleithania.

Biography
After studying law, he served as an imperial cavalry officer from 1841 to 1860 and attained the rank of major in Prince Eugene's Dragoons regiment.  In 1867 he entered political life as a member of the Bohemian Landtag (provincial assembly), being elected by the Liberal land proprietors. Ten months later, on the resignation of Count Hartig, he was appointed Supreme Marshal of the Kingdom of Bohemia, continuing in that office until 1870. In January 1869 he was nominated life member of the Upper Chamber of the Austrian Reichsrat, in which he took a conspicuous part.

He was governor of Salzburg from 1870 to 1871, and proved in that position, as well as in his subsequent political life, a staunch supporter of the constitution.

In 1871 he succeeded Karl von Hohenwart as prime minister for the western half of the empire (Minister-President of Cisleithania). Auersperg's ministry enacted a measure of electoral reform (1873), secured direct elections to the lower chamber of the Reichsrat, and strengthened the political entente with Hungary. Intraparty controversies over Austrian occupation of Bosnia finally forced him to resign in 1879. Auersperg's resignation marked the end of German liberalism in Austrian politics throughout the remaining years of the Empire.

Family
He was the son of Prince Wilhelm II of Auersperg (1781–1827), Duke of Gottschee, and Friederike Luise Henriette von Lenthe (1791–1860). His brother Prince Karl of Auersperg was also head of the Austrian ministry (1867–68). His other siblings were Aglae (1812–1899), Wilhelmine (1813–1886), Alexander (1818–1866) and Leopoldine (1820–1821). 

Adolf was married twice: 
the first time (1845) with Baroness Aloysia Johanna Mladota von Solopisk (1820–1849), daughter of Adalbert, Baron Mladota von Solopisk and Baroness Franziska Schirndinger von Schirnding; no issue
the second time (1857) with Countess Johanna Feststics von Tolna (1830–1884), daughter of Count Ernst Johann Wilhelm Festetics von Tolna and Baroness Johanna Clara Maria Josepha Kotz von Dobrz. This second marriage produced 5 children, including:
Karl (1859–1927), who became the 9th Prince of Auersperg. Karl married in 1885 Countess Eleonore Maria Gobertina Breunner von Enkevoirth (1864–1920), daughter of Count August Breunner von Enkevoirth and Countess Maria Agathe Szechenyi de Sarvár-Felsovidek. They had five children:
 Prince Adolf von Auersperg (1886–1923), married (1914) to Countess Gabrielle von Clam und Gallas (their son, Karl-Adolf, 10th Prince of Auersperg, married Countess Feodore of Solms-Baruth, daughter of Prince Friedrich III zu Solms-Baruth and Princess Adelaide of Schleswig-Holstein-Sonderburg-Glücksburg; had issue
 Princess Agathe von Auersperg (1888–1973), married (1913) to Alexander, 5th Prince of Schönburg-Hartenstein
 Princess Johanna von Auersperg (1890–1967), married (1917) to Count Rudolf of Meran, son of Count Franz of Meran and Countess Theresia von Lamberg (1836–1913)
 Princess Eleonore von Auersperg (1892–1967), married (1919) to Erwin Wallner, whose son Rudolf Wellner married Countess Marie Hoyos von und zu Stichsenstein (b.1921)
 Prince Karl von Auersperg-Breunner (1895–1980), married (1927) to Countess Henriette of Meran
Aglae Franziska (1868-1919), married Ferdinand Vincent, Count of Kinsky, had issue.

See also 

 Portrait at German Wikipedia

References 

 
 
  at genealogy.euweb.cz

External links 
 Otto 

1821 births
1885 deaths
19th-century Ministers-President of Austria
Politicians from Prague
Ministers-President of Austria
Adolf
Austrian people of German Bohemian descent
Austrian princes
Governors of Salzburg (state)
Knights of the Golden Fleece of Austria
Royal reburials